"Don't Let It End" is the third track and the second top 10 single on the 1983 album Kilroy Was Here, by Styx.

The song was written and sung by Dennis DeYoung. The track is a mid-tempo ballad about one who breaks up with a lover and pleads to get the person back. The song reached No. 6 on the U.S. Billboard Hot 100 the week of July 2, 1983 and No. 56 in the UK Singles Chart. It also reached No. 15 on the Canadian RPM Top Singles chart the week of July 2, 1983. At the time, it was the seventh Styx single to peak in the top 10 of the Billboard Hot 100.

Cash Box noted that the song is "a return to [DeYoung's] soft romantic side" after the more futuristic "Mr. Roboto and that guitarist Tommy Shaw "breaks up the weak-kneed plea with sturdy rock guitar work." 

According to Dennis DeYoung in a 2005 interview with classicrockrevisited.com, the track was originally slated as the first single from Kilroy Was Here until the staff at A&M suggested "Mr. Roboto".

Allmusic critic Stephen Thomas Erlewine criticized the compilation album Come Sail Away – The Styx Anthology for excluding this song.

Despite the song's enormous success, along with "Show Me the Way", "Babe" and "The Best of Times" it has not been performed live by the band since singer Dennis DeYoung was dismissed in 1999. DeYoung, however, still performs the song regularly on his solo tours.

Video
The video of the track was directed by Brian Gibson. It starts out with Dennis portraying Kilroy looking at a picture of a girlfriend he lost (the picture is of Dennis' wife in real life, Suzanne) and then gets up to go in another room which morphs into the prison that his character of Kilroy was in. Then Dennis morphs into the Kilroy as prisoner character and joins the members of Styx who play prisoners in the video performing the track and then the end shows Dennis as he appeared at the intro.

The reprise of the track was more to do with not letting rock and roll die and had a teaser of the riff to "Mr. Roboto" before ending like a 50s rocker with Tommy Shaw singing the first section and DeYoung the finale. The live version ends with the ending guitar chords from "Twist and Shout".

Personnel
Dennis DeYoung - lead vocals, keyboards
Tommy Shaw - lead guitar, backing vocals
James "J.Y." Young - rhythm guitar
Chuck Panozzo - bass
John Panozzo - drums

Chart performance

Weekly charts

Year-end charts

References

1983 singles
Styx (band) songs
Songs written by Dennis DeYoung
A&M Records singles
1980s ballads
1983 songs